A parable is a figurative story.

Parable may also refer to:

Music
Parables (oratorio), Robert Aldridge 2010
Parable, composition by Mark Bowden
Parables, by Vincent Persichetti (1915-1987) 
Parables,  album by Tarrus Riley  2006 
 The Parable (album), a 2017 album by the Jimmy Chamberlin Complex

Other uses
The Parable (statue), a 1990 sculpture of a seated man in Washington DC
Parable (film), a 1964 American short film
Parables TV, a Christian streaming media service

See also
Parabola